Charles H. Maher (February 7, 1902 – January 1, 1971) is a former American baseball coach and catcher. He played college baseball for Western Michigan for coach Judson Hyames from 1922 to 1925 before playing professionally in 1926. He then served as the head baseball coach of the Western Michigan Broncos from 1937 to 1943 and again from 1946 to 1967, leading the Broncos to six College World Series appearances including a second-place finish in the 1955 College World Series. In 1989, he was inducted into the Mid-American Conference Hall of Fame.

Head coaching record

References

External links

1902 births
1971 deaths
Western Michigan Broncos baseball players
Kalamazoo Celery Pickers players
Western Michigan Broncos baseball coaches
Sportspeople from Michigan
Baseball coaches from Michigan
Baseball players from Michigan